Leigo Lakes is a group of sixteen artificial lakes in Estonia.

See also
List of lakes of Estonia

Otepää Parish
Leigo
Tourist attractions in Valga County